Stadio Comunale Giovanni Celeste is a multi-use stadium in Messina, Italy. It is currently the home of S.S.D. Città di Messina (as known as Camaro). The stadium is able to hold 11,900 people.

History 
The stadium was named after  (1905–1943), an Italian serviceman who served in the Regia Marina during World War II.

It was used mostly for football matches and hosted the home matches since 1932 to 2004 of the former city teams. It was initially closed in 2004 when Stadio San Filippo opened and it was reopened since 2010–11 season to host the home games of the new town club of S.S.D. Città di Messina that plays in Serie D.

On June 5, 1982, the stadium has hosted a Euro 84 qualifier between Malta and Iceland because Malta's own stadium in Gżira was not up to scratch. Malta won the game 2–1 in front of a crowd of 1,271 spectators.

References

Giovanni 
Giovanni
Buildings and structures in Messina
Sports venues in Sicily
1932 establishments in Italy